The 3,000 personnel Peruvian Naval Infantry ( - IMAP) includes an amphibious brigade of three battalions and local security units with two transport ships (one used as a training ship), four tank landing ships, and about forty Portuguese Chaimite armored personnel carriers.

Since 1982 IMAP detachments have been deployed, under Peruvian Army command, in counter-insurgency capacities in Ayacucho and Huancavelica departments. The Fuerza de Infantería de Marina (Naval Infantry Force) falls under the Comandancia General de Operaciones del Pacífico (Pacific Operations General Command). In total, about 4,000 personnel serve in the Naval Infantry.

History

Founding
Following the creation of the Peruvian Navy on 23 October 1821, the Commander General of the Navy, Jorge Martín Guise, requested a garrison of 38 troops to be stationed at Balcarce and Belgrano. The formal request was made on 6 November 1821 to the Minister of War and Navy, creating the Navy Battalion. The Navy Brigade was later formed after another battalion was formed and on 2 June 1823, the brigade attacked the Spanish in Arica, successfully taking the city. During the War of the Confederation, the Navy Brigade fought in the Siege of Talcahuano on 23 November 1837. In 1847, President Ramón Castilla reorganized the Peruvian Navy, creating six companies of the naval infantry.

War of the Pacific
During the War of the Pacific, the Marine Garrison Battalion under the direction of the Commander General of the Navy was created on 10 January 1880 with a force of 600 men. The Marines participated in the Battle of Miraflores on 15 January 1881 with 524 Marines led by Juan Fanning and Guardia Chalaca. Both of the commanders were killed along with nearly all Marines, with the infamous shout of Fanning becoming a motto of the Peruvian Marines, "¡Adelante marina, marina adelante!" or "Forward Marine, Marine forward!".

Modernization

The Marines were received an update on 2 February 1919 when the Battalion of the Navy was organized into two companies of riflemen, one section of machine gunners and another section of servicemen, commanded by corvette captain Héctor Mercado. The Peruvian Navy in charge of defending the oil port of Talara then allied itself with the United States, patrolling the continent and the Panama Canal. On 9 June 1943, President Manuel Prado decreed the creation of the Infantería de Marina as part of the Naval Coast Defense Force. Through the 1950s and into the 1960s, multiple amphibious warfare ships and weapons were purchased. The Naval Station of Ancon was created on October 8, 1971, with the Amphibious Command Company headquartered there a year later providing logistical information to better organize amphibious operations.

Counterterrorism

Following over a decade of an authoritarian government in Peru, elections were held in 1980. Leftist armed groups arose, such as the Shining Path and later the Túpac Amaru Revolutionary Movement (MRTA). The Marines began counterterrorist operations against such groups stationed in the Ayacucho Region from 1985 to 1991, creating Task Force 90, later expanding to Ucayali, Huánuco and Loreto. In 1995, Marines also participated in the brief the Cenepa War, a brief territorial conflict with Ecuador.

On 17 December 1996, hundreds of diplomats, businessmen, as well as government and military officers were taken hostage by the MRTA at the Japanese ambassadors residence, initiating the Japanese embassy hostage crisis. Over the year, some hostages were released, though 72 hostages remained. Peruvian Marines were then involved in a hostage rescue operation, Operation Chavín de Huántar, named after the Chavín de Huantar archaeological site due to the tunnels dug by troops to access the ambassadors compound. The operation resulted in two commandos and one hostage dead while all fourteen militants were killed.

Organization

Brigada de Infanteria de Marina
 1st Naval Infantry Battalion - Ancón
 2nd Naval Infantry Battalion - Ancón
 Amphibious Support Group
 Fire support Group
 Commando Grouping
 Engineers Unit

Other units
 3rd Naval Infantry Battalion - Tumbes
 4th Naval Infantry Battalion - Puno
 1st Jungle Naval Infantry Battalion - Iquitos
 2nd Jungle Naval Infantry Battalion - Pucallpa
 Naval Infantry Detachment Litoral Sur - Mollendo
 Special Forces Espíritus Negros and Fuerza Delta, based on the American Delta Force and US Army Rangers.

Equipment

Weapons

Vehicles

See also
 Marines
 Peruvian Navy

References

External links
 Official Peruvian Navy Website
 The Peruvian Navy: the XIX Century Maritime Campaigns — a series of articles covering the history of the 19th century Peruvian Navy by Juan del Campo.
 Marine Link article with pics

Navy
Marines